A meteorite fall, also called an observed fall, is a meteorite collected after its fall from outer space was observed by people or automated devices. Any other meteorite is called a "find". There are more than 1,300 documented falls listed in widely used databases, most of which have specimens in modern collections. , the Meteoritical Bulletin Database had 1372 confirmed falls.

Importance 

Observed meteorite falls are important for several reasons.

Material from observed falls has not been subjected to terrestrial weathering, making the find a better candidate for scientific study. Historically, observed falls were the most compelling evidence supporting the extraterrestrial origin of meteorites. Furthermore, observed fall discoveries are a better representative sample of the types of meteorites which fall to Earth. For example, iron meteorites take much longer to weather and are easier to identify as unusual objects, as compared to other types. This may explain the increased proportion of iron meteorites among finds (6.7%), over that among observed falls (4.4%). There is also detailed statistics on falls such as based on meteorite classification.

As of January 2019, the Meteoritical Bulletin Database had 1,180 confirmed falls. Statistics by decade are listed in the table in this section.

List of meteorite falls

Oldest

The German physicist Ernst Chladni, sometimes considered as the father of meteoritics, was the first to publish in modern Western thought (in 1794) the then audacious idea that meteorites are rocks from space. There were already several documented cases, one of the earliest was the Aegospotami meteorite of 467 BC and which became a landmark for 500 years, of which Diogenes of Apollonia said:
With the visible stars revolve stones which are invisible, and for that reason nameless. They often fall on the ground and are extinguished, like the stone star that came down on fire at Aegospotami.
showing that the Greeks had a much earlier idea that meteorites are rocks from space.

Below is a list of 8 confirmed falls pre-1600 AD. However, unlike the Loket (Elbogen) and Ensisheim meteorites, not all are as well-documented.

Largest
While most confirmed falls involve masses between less than one kg to several kg, some reach 100 kg or more.  A few have fragments that total even more than one metric ton. The six largest falls are listed below and five (except the 2013 Chelyabinsk meteorite) occurred during the 20th century.  Presumably, events of such magnitude may happen a few times per century but, especially if it occurred in remote areas, may have gone unreported.

For comparison, the largest finds are the 60-ton Hoba meteorite, a 30.8-ton fragment (Gancedo) and a 28.8-ton fragment (El Chaco) of the Campo del Cielo, and a 30.9-ton fragment (Ahnighito) of the Cape York meteorite.

Recent

As of 31 August 2021, there have been 90 found since 2010.

Others
On 18 August 1907 multiple newspapers reported that a meteor fall had occurred in Amaganzett, Long Island.

These have all been found between 1610–2010 and arranged alphabetically (mostly).

See also
 Glossary of meteoritics
 Meteorite fall statistics

References 

 
Astronomical events of the Solar System
Light sources
Astronomy-related lists